Ernst Tüscher (August 3, 1911 – February 2, 1964) was a Swiss field hockey player who competed in the 1936 Summer Olympics. In 1936 he was a member of the Swiss team which was eliminated in the group stage of the Olympic tournament. He played all three matches as goalkeeper.

External links
 
Ernst Tüscher's profile at Sports Reference.com

1911 births
1964 deaths
Swiss male field hockey players
Olympic field hockey players of Switzerland
Field hockey players at the 1936 Summer Olympics